Floriano or Fioravante Ferramola (c. 1478 – 3 July 1528) was an Italian painter of the Renaissance period, active mainly in Brescia.

Biography
Mentioned for the first time in 1503, his first known work is a Nativity from 1507 to 1508, now in the Civi Museums of Pavia; in 1512 he painted a portrait of Gaston de Foix. Later Ferramola frescoed an Annunciation for the church of the Carmine in Brescia, and also painted for the church of Santa Maria delle Grazie in Brescia.  He is also known for his frescoes painted for the Palazzo Calini in Brescia, one of which may be viewed in London at the Victoria and Albert Museum.

Sources

External links

1528 deaths
Painters from Brescia
16th-century Italian painters
Italian male painters
Italian Renaissance painters
Year of birth unknown
Year of birth uncertain
Fresco painters